"Pass You By" is a song by American R&B quartet Boyz II Men, released from their fifth studio album, Nathan Michael Shawn Wanya (2000), on July 11, 2000. "Pass You By" was commercially unsuccessful, failing to appear on the US Billboard Hot 100 chart, peaking at number four on the Billboard Bubbling Under Hot 100. "Pass You By" also peaked at number 13 in Australia, number 73 in France, and number 98 in the Netherlands. The song was nominated for Best R&B Performance by a Duo or Group at the 2001 Grammy Awards.

Track listing
European CD single
 "Pass You By" (radio edit)
 "Darlin"
 "Rose and a Honeycomb"
 "Pass You By" (instrumental)

Charts

Release history

References

2000 singles
2000 songs
Boyz II Men songs
Universal Records singles
Music videos directed by Darren Grant
Songs written by Shawn Stockman